Werner Wrangel (24 March 1922 – 24 March 1945) was a Gefreiter in the German Army during World War II, who received three of Germany's highest military decorations during a single combat action. He was the only person ever to do so. Wrangel received the Iron Cross 2nd class, Iron Cross 1st Class, and the Knight's Cross of the Iron Cross simultaneously on 8 February 1943 for outstanding valour in repulsing a Soviet tank attack with his PAK gun virtually single-handedly, thereby saving the lives of hundreds of his comrades. Additionally, he received the Infantry Assault Badge (Sturmabzeichen) in silver. At the time he served with 1./Panzer-Jäger-Abteilung 160. Wrangel died in combat on 24 March 1945 near Trebur.

Awards
Knight's Cross of the Iron Cross on 8 February 1943 as Gefreiter and Richtschütze (gunner) in the 1./Panzer-Jäger-Abteilung 183

References

Citations

Bibliography

 
 

German Army personnel killed in World War II
Recipients of the Knight's Cross of the Iron Cross
1922 births
1945 deaths
People from Segeberg
People from the Province of Schleswig-Holstein
German Army soldiers of World War II
Military personnel from Schleswig-Holstein